Herbert Howard Hash (February 13, 1911 – May 20, 2008) was an American right-handed pitcher in Major League Baseball who played from 1940 to 1941 for the Boston Red Sox. He was born in Woolwine, Virginia.

Early life 
Hash was born near the location of the present day Woolwine Elementary School. He attended the University of Richmond and is a member of the University's Hall of Fame.

Professional baseball career 
Hash made his debut for the Red Sox on April 19, 1940. Hash was used extensively during the 1940 season, making his first start on May 26 at Fenway Park. He was knocked out of the game in the sixth inning but came back four days later to pitch the first complete game of his career at Yankee Stadium before a capacity crowd of 82,437. It was customary to play doubleheaders in this era on Memorial Day, and he started the second game of the twin bill. He scattered six hits in an 11–4 victory. He pitched his first career shutout on June 23 at Municipal Stadium against the Cleveland Indians as the Red Sox won 2–0. The 1941 season proved to be his last stint in the major leagues, with his final appearance occurring on April 30, 1941.

A string of injuries and illnesses cut short what looked to be a very promising baseball career, as Hash had a very serious back injury which required a spinal fusion and 145 stitches in his back. He continued to pitch in the minor leagues, with his latest documented minor league stint coming in 1946.

His lifetime major league stats are 38 games with a record of 8–7, a 4.98 earned run average, 3 complete games, 1 shutout and 4 saves in 128⅓ innings pitched, with a lifetime batting average of .167.

Personal life 
Hash also served in the educational field during his baseball career. After his baseball career ended, he served as a teacher or principal for thirty three years.

Death and legacy 
Herb Hash died of a stroke on May 20, 2008 in Culpeper, Virginia, with his death announced by Red Sox commentators Jerry Remy and Don Orsillo during play versus the Kansas City Royals. At the time of his death, at the age of 97, Hash had been recognized as the fourth-oldest living former major league ballplayer, and the second oldest former Red Sox player.

References

External links

MLB historical player statistics
Herb Hash at Baseball Almanac

Major League Baseball pitchers
Boston Red Sox players
Canton Terriers players
Rocky Mount Red Sox players
Minneapolis Millers (baseball) players
Louisville Colonels (minor league) players
Danville Leafs players
Richmond Spiders baseball players
Baseball players from Virginia
1911 births
2008 deaths
People from Patrick County, Virginia